GoBeyond Student Travel is an organization which offers community service based adventure programs during the Northern Hemisphere summertime to teenagers.  Programs are run in the British Virgin Islands, Ecuador and the Galapagos, Thailand, China, Costa Rica, India, Peru and Australia.

History 
GoBeyond grew from the experience of its sister institutions, ActionQuest and Sea|mester, with a decided aim on global community service. After the events of September 11, 2001, ActionQuest decided to develop a program aimed at service, which became GoBeyond Student Travel.

GoBeyond ran its first programs in 2003 in the British Virgin Islands, Australia, and the Galapagos. In 2004, GoBeyond Thailand began, and in 2005, GoBeyond China and Costa Rica began. In 2010, GoBeyond expanded offerings to India and Peru.

Affiliates 

 China Care Foundation
 Virgin Island Search and Rescue (VISAR)www.visar.org 
 BVI Conservation and Fisheries Department 
 The Darwin Initiative
 BVI National Parks Trust
 The Fundacion Humanitaria 
 The Galapagos National Parks Trust
 Charles Darwin Foundation
 The Duang Prateep Foundation
 Australian Red Cross
 Association of Reef Keepers (ARK)

References

External links 
 ActionQuest Global Programs
 Seamester Global Programs
 GoBeyond Global Programs
 China Care Foundation
 Virgin Island Search and Rescue

International development organizations
Companies based in Florida